Daniel Kistler (born 17 June 1962) is a Swiss judoka. He competed in the men's middleweight event at the 1992 Summer Olympics.

References

External links
 

1962 births
Living people
Swiss male judoka
Olympic judoka of Switzerland
Judoka at the 1992 Summer Olympics
Place of birth missing (living people)